The 1982–83 Tennessee Volunteers basketball team represented the University of Tennessee as a member of the Southeastern Conference during the 1982–83 college basketball season. Led by head coach Don DeVoe, the team played their home games at the Stokely Athletic Center in Knoxville, Tennessee. The Volunteers finished with a record of 20–12 (9–9 SEC, 7th) and received an at-large bid to the 1983 NCAA tournament as the 8 seed in the Mideast region.

Senior Dale Ellis was named the SEC Player of the Year for the second consecutive season. Ellis would be drafted by the Dallas Mavericks with the 9th pick of the first round of the 1983 NBA draft.

Roster

Schedule and results

|-
!colspan=9 style=| Regular season

|-
!colspan=9 style=| SEC tournament

|-
!colspan=9 style=| NCAA tournament

Rankings

NBA Draft

References

Tennessee Volunteers basketball seasons
Tennessee
Tennessee
Volunteers
Volunteers